Guazapares is one of the 67 municipalities of Chihuahua, in northern Mexico. The municipal seat lies at Témoris. The municipality covers an area of 2,145.8 km².

As of 2010, the municipality had a total population of 8,998, up from  8,010 as of 2005. 

The municipality had 492 localities, the largest of which (with 2010 populations in parentheses) was: Témoris (2,053), classified as rural.

Geography

Towns and villages
The municipality has 352 localities. The largest are:

References

Municipalities of Chihuahua (state)